Warson Woods Creek is a stream in St. Louis County in the U.S. state of Missouri. It is a tributary to Deer Creek.

Warson Woods Creek takes its name from the city of Warson Woods, Missouri, a settlement along its headwaters.

References

Rivers of Missouri
Rivers of St. Louis County, Missouri